Shear Genius 3 is the third season of Bravo's Shear Genius.  This season is hosted by Camila Alves, who took over hosting duties from Jaclyn Smith.

Contestants

Episode progress 

 (WINNER) The stylist won the series and was crowned Shear Genius.
 (WIN) The stylist won that episode's Elimination Challenge.
 (HIGH) The stylist was selected as one of the top entries in the Elimination Challenge, but did not win.
 (LOW) The stylist was selected as one of the bottom entries in the Elimination Challenge, but was not eliminated.
 (LOW) The stylist was in the bottom two for the Elimination Challenge.
 (CUT) The stylist lost this week's Elimination Challenge and was out of the competition.
 (IN) The stylist neither won nor lost that week's Elimination Challenge.

Episodes

Episode 1: A Risque Runway
First Aired: February 3, 2010

Short Cut Challenge: Give clients with punk rock hairstyles a new and sophisticated look

Best 3: Amy, Arzo, Giacomo
Worst 3: Brian, Faatemah, Janine
WINNER: Amy

Elimination Challenge: Design a hairstyle that covers a models bare breasts for a swimsuit runway show

WINNER: Janine
CUT: Joey

Judges: Camila Alves, Kim Vo, Jonathan Antin, Monica Wise

Episode 2: I'm Totally Stealing Your Model
First Aired: February 10, 2010

Short Cut Challenge: To bring a clients stained "dead" hair back to life via color.

Best 3: Janine, Jon, Matthew
Worst 3: Adee, April, Brian
WINNER: Matthew

Elimination Challenge: The contestants had to make a hairstyle inspired by an entrée.

Stylists & Entrées:
Adee- Steak Tartare
Amy-Dakota Burger
April-Heirloom Tomato Salad
Arzo-Tuna Tataki
Brian-Chocolate Mousse
Brig-Tiramisu
Faatemah-Orange Flan Trio
Janine-Beet Salad
Jon-Seared Scallops
Matthew-Yellowtail Hamachi

WINNER: Jon
CUT: Arzo
Withdrew: Giacomo

Judges: Camila Alves, Kim Vo, Jonathan Antin

Episode 3: The Spiral of My Emotion 
First Aired: February 17, 2010

Short Cut Challenge: Design a hairstyle for men using extensions.

Best 2: Janine, Matthew
Worst 2: Amy, Faatemah

WINNER: Matthew

Elimination Challenge: The contestants had to make a hairstyle for a romance novel cover. They worked in teams of two with one stylist forced to work solo.

Teams:
Adee & Faatemah
Amy & Brian
April & Jon
Brig
Janine & Matthew

WINNER: Matthew
CUT: Faatemah

Judges: Camila Alves, Kim Vo, Jonathan Antin, Ken Paves

Episode 4: I'm Borderline Pissed Off About That Hair
First Aired: February 24, 2010

Short Cut Challenge: Design a hairstyle featuring a variety of flowers.

Best 2: April, Brian
Worst 2: Adee, Jon

WINNER: Brian

Elimination Challenge: Style the hair of 8 bridesmaids for an Indian wedding.

WINNER: Brian
CUT: Adee

Judges: Camila Alves, Kim Vo, Jonathan Antin, Tabatha Coffey

Episode 5: For The First Time I'm Scared To Death 
First Aired: March 3, 2010

Short Cut Challenge: Use dry hair cutting technique on curly hair.

Best 2: Janine, Matthew
Worst 2: April, Brig

WINNER: Janine

Elimination Challenge: Design 1940's hairstyles using pin curls and finger waves.

WINNER: Brig
CUT: Amy

Judges: Camila Alves, Kim Vo, Jonathan Antin, Robert Vetica

Episode 6: It's All Fun and Games Until Someone Gets Annoying
First Aired: March 10, 2010

Short Cut Challenge: Interpret geometric shapes into angular hairstyles on Asian clients.

Best: Janine
Worst 2: Matthew, April

WINNER: Janine

Elimination Challenge: Create two different headshot looks on working actresses.

WINNER: Matthew
CUT: April

Judges: Camila Alves, Kim Vo, Jonathan Antin, Kevin Mancuso

Episode 7: Hotter Than a Gay Bar on Fire
First Aired: March 17, 2010

Short Cut Challenge: Style African American hair from high school style to a sophisticated look.

Best 2: Brian, Janine
Worst: Brig

WINNER: Janine

Elimination Challenge: Style hair for a runway hosted by Estelle.

WINNER: Janine
CUT: Brian

Judges: Camila Alves, Kim Vo, Jonathan Antin, Estelle

Episode 8: The Higher the Hair, the Closer to God
First Aired: March 24, 2010

Short Cut Challenge:  Competitors choose tools, styles and inspiration for each other.
Best: Jon
Worst: Brig

WINNER: Jon

Elimination Challenge: Make a classic, modern, Hollywood look.

WINNER: Matthew
CUT: None

Judges: Camila Alves, Kim Vo, Jonathan Antin, Linda Wells

Brig and Jon were bottom two, and each dictated the reasons why each should stay. It was then revealed that no one would be eliminated.

Episode 9: Bring It On, Bitches
First Aired: March 31, 2010

Short Cut Challenge: Style their first celebrity client.

WINNER: Matthew

Elimination Challenge: Develop two different looks for two different models.

WINNER: Brig
CUT: Jon

Judges: Camila Alves, Kim Vo, Jonathan Antin, Oribe

Episode 10: Who Will Prove to Be Shear Genius?
First Aired: April 7, 2010

Final Challenge: Each of the final three contestants must style six models for a fashion show.

Shear Genius Winner: Brig
Runners-Up: Janine Jarman (First Runner-Up); Matthew (Second Runner-Up)

Judges: Camila Alves, Kim Vo, Jonathan Antin, Linda Wells

Shear Genius
2010 American television seasons